The Centre for Window and Cladding Technology (CWCT) is a publisher of standards and guidance only (not regulations), on corrosion, intrusion, fenestration, weather and fire resistance, acoustic and impact performance, of building envelopes, facades, cladding and glazing.
Founded in 1989 and based in Bath, Somerset, the CWCT provides training and courses, hosts international events, conferences, seminars and is recognised by over 330 member companies within the construction industry.



Guidance on Fire Performance of façade cladding

TN98 (supersedes previous technical note TN73) Guidance for the fire performance of facades (including cladding) and suggests that any buildings with compartmented floors will limit spread of fire, thus affecting the design of interface points where the compartment floors meet the façade. Therefore, both of those components must be considered together, not in isolation. Fire resisting construction discourages the use of combustible materials in cladding to minimize the spread of fire, together with insisting adequate fire barriers are employed within building cavities. The specific fire strategy for the building, will be set out by the fire engineer including the requirements for the façade cladding. The fire performance of the cladding and façade should form a key part of the early in the design process and fire strategy. Clearly the fire regulations specified here fall short of any requirement to state life saving requirements of fire spread by external cladding, cladding specification is entirely dependent on type of building construction combined with fire strategy dictated by the local fire officer, all is very ambiguous and clearly needs some serious changes to effect a fire resistant building, only apparent since the Grenfell Tower fire.

Documents published by the CWCT

 Windows with enhanced resistance to intrusion  1994    
 Guide to good practice for facades  1996    
 Guide to the selection and testing of stone panels for external use  1997    
 Performance and testing of fixings for thin stone cladding  1999    
 Standard for systemised building envelopes  2006     
 TN 7  Threat resistant fenestration  2000    
 TN 8  Selection of windows - a checklist for specifiers  2000    
 TN 17  Weathertightness and drainage  2000    
 TN 24  Corrosion  2000    
 TN 38  Acoustic performance of windows  2003    
 TN 39  Sound transmission through building envelopes  2003    
 TN 41  Site testing for watertightness  2004    
 TN 52  Impact performance of cladding  2006    
 TN 53  Method statements for the construction of building envelopes  2009    
 TN 61  Glass types  2009    
 TN 66  Safety and fragility of glazed roofing: guidance on specification  2010    
 TN 67  Safety and fragility of glazed roofing: testing and assessment  2010    
 TN 71  Standards and performance classification of windows and doors  2011    
 TN 72  External shading devices  2011   
 TU 15  Replacement of British Structural design codes by Eurocodes  2011   
 TN 75  Impact performance of building envelopes: guidance on specification  2012    
 TN 76  Impact performance of building envelopes: method for impact testing of cladding panels  2012    
 TN 77  Assessment and certification of rainscreen systems  2012    
 TN 78  Interfaces and joints - introduction  2012    
 TN 96  Assessing cradle and suspended access equipment loads  2016    
 TN 97  Selection of access equipment for façade maintenance  2016 .
 TN98  Fire performance of facades - UK Building Regulations- (supersedes TN73) 2017.

References

Fire protection organizations
Organizations established in 1989
1989 establishments in the United Kingdom